Amédée Pofey or Amedeo Buffa (also Buffedus and Buffois) in the contemporary sources, was a knight and lord of the Latin Empire and of the Kingdom of Thessalonica.

Originally from Cologny, he became constable of the Kingdom of Thessalonica after its establishment and then grand constable of the Latin Empire of Constantinople. His latter title is attested from a document from 1208 wherein he donated his titles and possessions in Cologny to the Bishopric of Geneva.

Sources
 
 

13th-century French people
Latin Empire people
People of the Kingdom of Thessalonica